Nelly Sawe is a Kenyan footballer who plays as a full-back for Thika Queens and the Kenya women's national team.

International career
Sawe capped for Kenya at senior level during the 2019 CECAFA Women's Championship and the 2020 Turkish Women's Cup.

See also
List of Kenya women's international footballers

References

Year of birth missing (living people)
Living people
People from Uasin Gishu County
Kenyan women's footballers
Women's association football fullbacks
Kenya women's international footballers